Ignatov is a rural locality (a khutor) in Alexeyevsky District, Belgorod Oblast, Russia. The population was 55 as of 2010. There are 2 streets.

Geography 
Ignatov is located 6 km west of Alexeyevka (the district's administrative centre) by road. Alexeyevka is the nearest rural locality.

References 

Rural localities in Alexeyevsky District, Belgorod Oblast